Wycliffe Ochomo (born 2 August 1990) is a Kenyan international footballer who plays for Bandari, as a striker.

Career
Ochomo has played club football for Gor Mahia, Congo United, Ulinzi Stars, Admiral, Police, Muhoroni Youth, Kakamega Homeboyz and Bandari.

He made his international debut for Kenya in 2016.

References

1990 births
Living people
Kenyan footballers
Kenya international footballers
Gor Mahia F.C. players
F.C. West Ham United players
Ulinzi Stars F.C. players
Admiral F.C. players
Muhoroni Youth F.C. players
Kakamega Homeboyz F.C. players
Bandari F.C. (Kenya) players
Kenyan Premier League players
Association football forwards